William McLeod is the name of:

William McLeod (footballer) (1860–1943), Scottish international footballer
William McLeod (Paralympian), British lawn bowls player
William Duncan McLeod (1852–1908), Canadian factory owner and politician
William Mackenzie McLeod (1854–1932), Canadian physician and politician
William McLeod, television producer and director of photography in the film Calculated Risk

See also
William MacLeod (disambiguation)